Edit Stift (born 9 April 1980) is a Hungarian rower. She competed in the women's lightweight double sculls event at the 2004 Summer Olympics.

References

External links
 

1980 births
Living people
Hungarian female rowers
Olympic rowers of Hungary
Rowers at the 2004 Summer Olympics
Rowers from Budapest